Oshtormel (also Romanized as Oshtor Mol) is a village in Seyyed Shahab Rural District, in the Central District of Tuyserkan County, Hamadan Province, Iran. At the 2006 census, its population was 1,891, in 475 families.

References 

Populated places in Tuyserkan County